Grab bag may mean

 Bug-out bag or Survival kit, a portable collection of emergency supplies
 Fukubukuro, a Japanese custom where old merchandise is sold at discount prices
 Party favor gift bags
 Walkers (snack foods) slightly larger than normal packet of crisps.
 "Grabbag" (song), the theme song of Duke Nukem 3D